Sabryn Genet (born May 14, 1971, as Sabryn Genet Ertle in Orange County, California) is an American actress.

She is best known for her role as Tricia Dennison McNeil in The Young and the Restless
from 1997 to 2001.  She received the Outstanding Female Newcomer Award at the 14th Soap Opera Digest Awards in 1998 for her role as Tricia. She has since married and has left showbusiness.

References

External links 

1971 births
Living people
American soap opera actresses
21st-century American women